Pchegatlukay is a rural locality (an aul) and the administrative center of Pchegatlukayskoye Rural Settlement of Teuchezhsky District, the Republic of Adygea, Russia. The population was 869 as of 2018. There are 21 streets.

Geography 
The aul is located on the left bank of the Psekups River, 14 km west of Ponezhukay (the district's administrative centre) by road. Neshukay is the nearest rural locality.

Ethnicity 
The aul is inhabited by Circassians.

References 

Rural localities in Teuchezhsky District